Theriot is a surname. It may refer to:

Ferdinand Thieriot (1838–1919), German composer
Jamie Theriot (born 1979), American jockey
Julie Theriot (born 1967), American biologist
Max Thieriot (born 1988), American actor
Ryan Theriot (born 1979), American baseball player
Sam H. Theriot (born 1954), American politician
Shane Theriot, American musician
Christian Theriot, American musician
Jacob Theriot, American musician

See also
Theriot, Lafourche Parish, Louisiana
Theriot, Terrebonne Parish, Louisiana
Thieriot